Calliano (Caliam or Calian in local dialect) is a comune (municipality) in Trentino in the northern Italian region Trentino-Alto Adige/Südtirol, located about  south of Trento.  

Calliano borders the following municipalities: Besenello, Nomi, Folgaria, Volano, and Rovereto.

See also 
 Battle of Calliano (1487), fought between Venetian and Austrian forces
 Battle of Calliano, fought 1796 between French and Austrian forces

References

Cities and towns in Trentino-Alto Adige/Südtirol